Ypthima pupillaris, the eyed ringlet, is a butterfly in the family Nymphalidae. It is found in Guinea, Ivory Coast, Ghana, Togo, Nigeria, Cameroon, the Republic of the Congo, the Democratic Republic of the Congo, Sudan, Ethiopia, Uganda, Kenya, Tanzania, Malawi, Zambia, Zimbabwe, and Mozambique. The habitat consists of grassland at altitudes above 1,500 meters and woodland.

Adults are on wing in June, September, October, February, March and April.

Subspecies
The species may be divided into the following subspecies:
 Ypthima pupillaris pupillaris (Guinea, Ivory Coast, Ghana, Togo, Nigeria, Cameroon, Congo, Democratic Republic of the Congo, Sudan, Uganda, northern Zambia, northern and eastern Zimbabwe, Mozambique)
 Ypthima pupillaris obscurata Kielland, 1982 (Ethiopia, Kenya, Democratic Republic of the Congo, western Tanzania, Malawi)

References

pupillaris
Butterflies described in 1888
Butterflies of Africa
Taxa named by Arthur Gardiner Butler